The FC Istiklol 2022 season was Istiklol's fourteenth Tajik League season, of which they are defending Tajik League Champions, whilst they also participated in the Tajik Cup, Tajik Supercup and AFC Champions League.

Season events
On 26 February, Zoir Juraboev left Istiklol to join Surkhon in the Uzbekistan Super League.

On 10 March, Amirbek Juraboev left Istiklol to join United City in the Philippines Football League.

On 19 March, Shokhrukh Kirgizboev joined Khujand on loan for the season.

Istiklol's first four Tajikistan Higher League matches of the season where postponed due to their participation on the 2022 AFC Champions League.

On 31 March, Istiklol announced the signings of Nuriddin Davronov, Eric Bocoum, Nikita Chicherin, Uladzislaw Kasmynin, Temur Partsvania, Mukhammad Isaev, Sayedi Kovussho, Mukhammadzhon Rakhimov, Tabrezi Davlatmir and Alidzhon Karomatullozoda.

On 26 June, Istiklol announced that Nuriddin Davronov had left the club to sign for Mohammedan on a one-year contract.

On 27 June, Vitaly Levchenko and his coaching staff left Istiklol after their contracts expired, with Assistant Manager Alisher Tukhtaev being placed in interim charger.

On 6 July, Istiklol announced that Nikita Chicherin and Mukhammad Isaev had left the club after their contracts had expired.

On 2 August, Istiklol announced that Rustam Soirov had left the club to join Levadia Tallinn on a three-year contract. The following day, 3 August, Istiklol announced the signings of Gonzalo Ritacco, Siyovush Asrorov, 	Idriss Aminu, Hlib Hrachov and Parviz Baki-Akhunov.

Squad

Transfers

In

Loans in

Out

Released

Trial

Friendlies

TFF Cup

Preliminary round

Competitions

Overview

Tajik Supercup

Tajikistan Higher League

Regular season

Results summary

Results by round

Results

League table

Championship round

Results summary

Results by round

Results

League table

Tajikistan Cup

Final

AFC Champions League

Group stage

Squad statistics

Appearances and goals

|-
|colspan="16"|Youth team players:
|-
|colspan="16"|Players away from Istiklol on loan:
|-
|colspan="16"|Players who left Istiklol during the season:

|}

Goal scorers

Clean sheets

Disciplinary record

References

External links 
 FC Istiklol Official Web Site

FC Istiklol seasons
Istiklol